Halim or Haleem is one of the names of God in Islam and as such is a male Muslim name or surname.

Halim or Haleem may also refer to:

 Halim (album), a 1997 Belgian record by Natacha Atlas
 Halim (film), a 2006 film
 Halim Alizehi, village in Iran
 Halim railway station, a railway station complex in Jakarta, Indonesia
 Haleem, a type of stew popular in the Middle East, Central Asia, and the Indian subcontinent

See also
Abdul Halim, a given name and surname